is a Japanese goalball player who won a gold medal at the 2012 Summer Paralympics.

Her impairment was caused by retinitis pigmentosa, which destroyed her vision in both eyes when she was 20 years old. She began playing goalball in 2004.

References 

Paralympic gold medalists for Japan
Goalball players at the 2008 Summer Paralympics
Goalball players at the 2012 Summer Paralympics
Goalball players at the 2016 Summer Paralympics
Sportspeople from Kumamoto Prefecture
1977 births
Living people
Medalists at the 2012 Summer Paralympics
Paralympic goalball players of Japan
Female goalball players
University of Teacher Education Fukuoka alumni
Paralympic medalists in goalball
Goalball players at the 2020 Summer Paralympics
20th-century Japanese women
21st-century Japanese women